Islamic Republican may refer to:

Islamic Republican (newspaper), official Iranian newspaper
Islamic Republican Party, political party in Iran

See also
Islamic republic (disambiguation)